Mihajlo Obrenov aka miKKa (born 1982) is a Serbian musician, sound engineer and film director. His main work consists of experimentation with sound and exploration of weird ambient noises.

See also
Music of Serbia
Electronic rock
dreDDup

References

External links
 

1982 births
Living people
Serbian musicians
Serbian record producers
Serbian film directors